The Stone Arch Bridge is a bridge in Danville, Illinois, which carries U.S. Route 136 (US 136; East Main Street) across Stony Creek. The bridge was built in the 1890s to facilitate Danville's expansion during an industrial boom. As various geographic and political limitations prevented the city from expanding in any directions but east and southeast, the city grew over Stony Creek, necessitating a new bridge. Mayor John Beard commissioned the bridge; during the 1890s, Beard and political rival John Cannon clashed over many issues, and Beard most likely built the bridge to demonstrate his political effectiveness. The bridge is the only segmented arch bridge remaining in east-central Illinois and is one of five stone arch bridges in the region.

The bridge was listed on the National Register of Historic Places in 1986.

See also
 
 
 
 
 List of bridges on the National Register of Historic Places in Illinois
 National Register of Historic Places listings in Vermilion County, Illinois

References

Road bridges on the National Register of Historic Places in Illinois
Buildings and structures in Danville, Illinois
Bridges completed in 1895
U.S. Route 136
National Register of Historic Places in Vermilion County, Illinois
Bridges of the United States Numbered Highway System
Stone arch bridges in the United States